Leonardo Dutra (born 29 March 1996) is a Brazilian handball player for RK Vardar and the Brazilian national team.

He participated at the 2017 World Men's Handball Championship.

Titles
Pan American Men's Club Handball Championship:
2017

Individual awards and achievements
Top Scorer
2016 Pan American Men's Club Handball Championship
MVP
2016 Pan American Men's Club Handball Championship
Liga Nacional de Handebol 2016
All star team left back
2016 Pan American Men's Club Handball Championship
2017 Pan American Men's Club Handball Championship

References

1996 births
Living people
Brazilian male handball players
South American Games gold medalists for Brazil
South American Games medalists in handball
Competitors at the 2018 South American Games
Handball players at the 2014 Summer Youth Olympics
Handball players at the 2020 Summer Olympics